Bard Gapi (also Romanized as Bard Gapī and Bard-i-Gappi; also known as Bard Gep) is a village in Howmeh-ye Sharqi Rural District, in the Central District of Izeh County, Khuzestan Province, Iran. At the 2006 census, its population was 1,602, in 288 families.

References 

Populated places in Izeh County